Boreotrophon dabneyi is a species of sea snail, a marine gastropod mollusc in the family Muricidae, the murex snails or rock snails.

Description

Distribution
This marine species occurs off the Azores.

References

External links
 MNHN, Paris: syntype
 Dautzenberg, Ph. (1889). Contribution à la faune malacologique des Iles Açores. Résultats des Campagnes Scientifiques Accomplies sur son Yacht par Albert Ier Prince Souverain de Monaco, I. Imprimerie de Monaco: Monaco. 112, IV plates
 Locard A. (1897–1898). Expéditions scientifiques du Travailleur et du Talisman pendant les années 1880, 1881, 1882 et 1883. Mollusques testacés. Paris, Masson. vol. 1 [1897], pp. 1–516 pl. 1–22; vol. 2 [1898], pp. 1–515, pl. 1–18.
  Serge GOFAS, Ángel A. LUQUE, Joan Daniel OLIVER,José TEMPLADO & Alberto SERRA (2021) - The Mollusca of Galicia Bank (NE Atlantic Ocean); European Journal of Taxonomy 785: 1–114

Gastropods described in 1889
Boreotrophon